Myint Myint May was a Burmese model and beauty pageant titleholder who was crowned Miss Burma 1960. In September 2009, she passed away.

As a Miss Universe 1960 contestant representing Burma, she won the award of  Miss Congeniality. This was the first time Myanmar won that title. But , she was unplaced in Miss Universe 1960.

References

Burmese beauty pageant winners
Burmese female models
Miss Universe 1960 contestants
Miss Universe Myanmar winners
20th-century Burmese women